Ingelger (died 888), also called Ingelgarius, was a Frankish nobleman, who was the founder of the County of Anjou and of the original House of Anjou. Later generations of his family believed that he was the son of Tertullus (Tertulle) and Petronilla.

Around 877, he inherited his father Tertullus' lands in accordance with the Capitulary of Quierzy, which Charles the Bald had issued.

Later, in accordance with family tradition, his mother was made a relative of Hugh the Abbot, an influential counselor of both Louis II and Louis III of France, from whom he received preferment. By Louis II Ingelger was appointed viscount of Orléans, which city was under the rule of its bishops at the time. At Orléans Ingelger made a matrimonial alliance with one of the leading families of Neustria, the lords of Amboise. 

He married Adelais, whose maternal uncles were Adalard, Archbishop of Tours, and Raino, Bishop of Angers. Later Ingelger was appointed prefect (military commander) at Tours, then ruled by Adalard.

At some point, Ingelger was appointed Count of Anjou, at a time when the county stretched only as far west as the river Mayenne. Later sources credit his appointment to his defense of the region from Vikings, but modern scholars have been more likely to see it as a result of his wife's influential relatives.

Ingelger was buried in the Church of Saint-Martin at Châteauneuf-sur-Sarthe. He was succeeded by his son Fulk the Red.

Notes

References

External links
Halphen, Louis and René Poupardin. Chroniques des Comtes d'Anjou et des Seigneurs d'Amboise. Steve Lane, trans. Paris: Picard, 1913. Part of Medieval Sourcebook.
The Legendary Ancestry of Fulko Rufus Contains a well thought-out and referenced discussion of Ingelger's probable ancestry.
Fulk Nerra, the Neo-Roman Consul 987-1040: A Political Biography of the Angevin Count by Bernard S. Bachrach

House of Ingelger
Counts of Anjou
888 deaths
Year of birth unknown